UniSuper is an Australian superannuation fund that provides superannuation services to employees of Australia's higher education and research sector. The fund has over 450,000 members and $100 billion in assets (funds under management and total member accounts at 7 July 2021).

UniSuper is a not-for-profit company whose shareholders are 37 Australian universities and is governed by a corporate Trustee, UniSuper Limited.  All the universities have representation on the Consultative Committee.

UniSuper has been granted a MySuper authority, enabling it to continue to receive default superannuation contributions from 1 January 2014.

Fund History
UniSuper was founded in October 2000, as a result of a merger between the Superannuation Scheme for Australian Universities (SSAU) and the Tertiary Education Superannuation Scheme (TESS). Prior to the merger, UniSuper had been the trustee for the SSAU.

UniSuper has pursued a strategy of buying 'fortress' stocks (defensible against disruption), as well as bringing investment functions in-house, in order to achieve significant returns over time.

Fund Governance
UniSuper's day-to-day administration is managed by a wholly owned company, UniSuper Management Pty Ltd (UniSuper Management).

UniSuper's Chief Executive Officer is Peter Chun.

Board of Directors
UniSuper's Board of Directors governs the operations of UniSuper to ensure the Fund is administered in accordance with the Trust Deed, and determines the strategic direction of the Fund. The Board represents, and is accountable to, the members of UniSuper and the Fund's participating employers.

The directors of UniSuper as of 2017 are:

Directors representing employers
 Nominated by shareholder universities
 Professor Peter Dawkins (Vice-Chancellor and President, Victoria University)
 Professor Jane den Hollander (Vice Chancellor, Deakin University)
 Nominated by the Consultative Committee employer representatives
 Nicole Gower
 Stephen Somogyi

Directors representing members
 Nominated by the Consultative Committee member representatives
 Professor Lelia Green 
 Keith Tull
 Nominated by national unions
 Grahame McCulloch - National Tertiary Education Union
 Sarah Roberts - National Tertiary Education Union

Independent Directors
 Ian Martin AM (Chairman)
 Nicolette Rubinsztein
 Mark Amour

Consultative Committee

The Consultative Committee reviews and approves changes to the Trust Deed and is responsible for nominating four directors to the Board of Directors.

Shareholder universities each appoint up to four members to the Consultative Committee. Half the members represent the employers, the other half represents, equally, academic staff and general staff.

As at 24 March 2017, the Consultative Committee had 145 members and there were four vacant positions.

See also
Superannuation in Australia
Australian Retirement Trust
AustralianSuper
Aware Super
Hostplus
Vanguard Super

References

External links
 UniSuper

Australian companies established in 2000
Financial services companies established in 2000
Higher education in Australia
Superannuation funds in Australia